"So Much Better" is a song by Swedish singer Sandro Cavazza, available on his debut extended play Sandro Cavazza. In May 2017, a Lost Frequencies remixed version was a released as a digital single.

In August 2017, an Avicii remix was included on Avicii's extended play Avīci (01) which saw the song debut on the Swedish singles chart at number 12.

Music video
The music video for "So Much Better" was directed by Robin Kempe-Bergman, produced by Robinovich and released on 8 June 2017.

Cavazza said, "Recording the video for "So Much Better" was the most honest and crazy creative experience of my life! I spent 24 hours filming in a row and the post-production by Robinovich is just amazing. The team has done such an great job realizing my vision of the video for this song."

Reception
Steph Evans of Earmilk wrote: "Cavazza takes a darker, more forward and downtempo turn" (on "So Much Better"), showcasing his falsetto and vocal talent over more stripped down production than what we've seen from him in the past, he brings the passion and force of a real star fighting for himself."

Track listing

Chart performance

Weekly charts

Release history

References

2017 singles
Swedish pop songs
Sandro Cavazza songs
2017 songs
Songs written by Sandro Cavazza